Cychrus naviauxi is a species of ground beetle in the subfamily of Carabinae. It was described by Deuve & Mourzine in 1998.

References

naviauxi
Beetles described in 1998